The 2012 Samsung Beach Soccer Intercontinental Cup was the second edition of the new tournament, following the success of the initial Beach Soccer Intercontinental Cup. It took place at a temporary stadium at Dubai Festival City in Dubai, United Arab Emirates from 30 October to 3 November 2012. Eight teams participated in the competition. The stadium had a capacity of 2,500 spectators.

Participating teams

Draw and schedule
The draw to divide the eight teams into two groups of four was conducted on 9 October 2012. The subsequent schedule was determined on 11 October 2012.

Group stage
All matches are listed as local time in Dubai, (UTC+4)

Group A

Group B

Knockout stage

Semi-finals

Third place play off

Final

Awards

Final standings

References

External links
 Beach Soccer Worldwide
 2012 Samsung Beach Soccer Intercontinental Cup Review

Samsung Beach
Beach Soccer Intercontinental Cup
International association football competitions hosted by the United Arab Emirates
Intercontinental Cup
Intercontinental Cup
Intercontinental Cup